John Malcolm   (31 August 1873 – 17 June 1954) was a New Zealand professor at the University of Otago 
and physiologist.

Life
He was born in Halkirk, Caithness, Scotland, on 31 August 1873 the son of John Malcolm, a public works contractor.

He studied medicine at the University of Edinburgh graduating with an MBChB in 1897 and gaining his MD in 1899. He initially lectured in chemical physiology at the University of Edinburgh. He lived at 1 Sciennes Road in the south side of the city.

In 1905 he obtained a post of professor of physiology at the University of Otago in New Zealand. In 1933 he was elected a Fellow of the Royal Society of Edinburgh. His proposers were Sir Edward Albert Sharpey-Schafer, William Anderson Bain, Walter Phillips Kennedy, and Philip Eggleton.

In the 1947 King's Birthday Honours, Malcolm was appointed a Companion of the Order of St Michael and St George for services to the medical profession.

Family
On 8 November 1912, he married Vicky Simpson at All Saints' Church in Dunedin. They had one daughter and two sons. One of their sons, John Laurence Malcolm, after working as senior lecturer with John Eccles from 1942 to 1947 at the University of Otago, worked temporarily at St Thomas's Hospital Medical School in London, then emigrated from New Zealand in 1953 to be professor of physiology at the University of Aberdeen and died in 2001.

Vicky Malcolm died in 1953. John Malcolm died in Dunedin on 17 June 1954.

References

1873 births
1954 deaths
Alumni of the University of Edinburgh
Academics of the University of Edinburgh
Fellows of the Royal Society of Edinburgh
New Zealand physiologists
People from Caithness
Scottish emigrants to New Zealand
New Zealand Companions of the Order of St Michael and St George
Academic staff of the University of Otago